"Now and Forever (You and Me)" is a hit song written by David Foster, Randy Goodrum and Jim Vallance and recorded by Canadian country music artist Anne Murray.  It was aided by a popular music video, filmed in Toronto. The back-up vocal was sung by Richard Page, lead singer for the Pop group Mr. Mister.

It was released in January 1986 as the first single from the Gold-certified album Something to Talk About.  The cut was Murray's tenth and, so far, final #1 hit on the U.S. Country singles chart and spent six weeks on the Billboard Hot 100.  It remained for a total of nineteen weeks on the Billboard Country chart. (This was Murray's final 45 to cross over to the U.S. 'Pop' chart.) The song was the last number one on the Billboard Hot Country Songs charts by a non-American until fellow Canadian Shania Twain's "Any Man of Mine" reached number one in 1995.

Chart performance

Notable Appearance in Other Media
 This song played during the closing credits of the episode of the American daytime soap opera All My Children on 24 March 1986.
 The song was used for the Sophia and C.C. characters on the American serial Santa Barbara.

References

1986 singles
1986 songs
Anne Murray songs
Songs written by David Foster
Songs written by Randy Goodrum
Songs written by Jim Vallance
Song recordings produced by David Foster
Capitol Records singles